Dirty Jobs is a program on the Discovery Channel, produced by Pilgrim Films & Television, in which host Mike Rowe is shown performing difficult, strange, disgusting, or messy occupational duties alongside the typical employees.  The show premiered with three pilot episodes in November 2003.  It returned as a series on July 26, 2005, and ended on September 12, 2012, with a total of 169 episodes spanning eight seasons. The series returned on July 7, 2020, with a spin-off titled Dirty Jobs: Rowe'd Trip.

The original series returned on January 2, 2022.

Series overview

Pilot episodes (2003)

Season 1 (2005)

Season 2 (2005–07)

Season 3 (2007–08)

Season 4 (2008–09)

Season 5 (2009–10)

Season 6 (2010–11)

Season 7 (2011–12)

Season 8 Dirty Jobs Down Under (2012)

Dirty Jobs: Rowe'd Trip (2020)

Season 9 (2022)

Season 10 (2022–23)

References

General references 
 
 
 
 
 
 

Dirty
Dirty Jobs
Dirty Jobs